Henry Bland may refer to:
Henry Bland (priest) (1677–1746), English cleric and provost of Eton College
Henry Flesher Bland (1818–1898), Methodist minister
Harry Bland (1898–?), English footballer
Sir Henry Bland (public servant) (1909–1997), Australian public servant
Henry Meade Bland (1863–1931), California educator and poet